Ella Road (born 1991) is a British screenwriter, playwright and actor. She is best known for her stage-play The Phlebotomist.

Career 
Road grew up in Archway and attended Dame Alice Owen's School, a state school in Potters Bar. She studied English at Somerville College, Oxford, and then earned a postgraduate degree in acting from Oxford School of Drama. According to The Telegraph newspaper, Road began writing her first play soon after completing her acting training in order to find more creative agency.

Theatre 
In 2018 Road's debut play The Phlebotomist premiered at Hampstead Theatre, directed by Sam Yates and starring Jade Anouka. The play is work of science-fiction exploring questions around genetic ethics. In 2019 The Phlebotomist received an Olivier Award nomination for Outstanding Achievement in an Affiliate Theatre, and was a finalist for the Susan Smith Blackburn Prize. Later that year Road adapted it into a radio drama for BBC Radio 3. In 2020 the play was translated into German under the title Die Laborantin, leading to productions across Germany and Austria, and it became the most performed new play in the German language of 2021.

In December 2021 Road's play Fair Play premiered at the Bush Theatre, produced in association with Sonia Friedman Productions. Fair Play explores the scrutinisation of women's bodies in sport, focusing on the experience of women athletes banned under IOC guidelines for having naturally elevated testosterone levels. In writing the script Road drew on her own experience as a competitive runner, and also developed the play in partnership with Intersex UK. The international release of a filmed online stream of the production was announced for 2022.

Television 
In May 2021 it was revealed that Road would be writing on two episodes of Ten Percent, the British remake of the French comedy series Call My Agent! on Amazon Prime.

In December 2021 it was announced that Road would be co-writing, alongside Chris Chibnall, "Legend of the Sea Devils", the second episode of the 2022 specials for Doctor Who.

References

External links
 

1991 births
Living people
21st-century British screenwriters
21st-century British women writers
British television writers
British women dramatists and playwrights
British women television writers
21st-century British dramatists and playwrights